Calvin Austin III (born March 24, 1999) is an American football wide receiver for the Pittsburgh Steelers of the National Football League (NFL). He played college football at Memphis.

Early life and high school
Austin was born March 24, 1999, grew up in Memphis, Tennessee, and attended Harding Academy. His family consists of his father, Calvin Austin II, and mother, Mimi Austin, and his four sisters: Cami Bea, Claudia-Ruthie, Naomi Pearl, and Bella Rose.

College career
Austin redshirted his true freshman season at Memphis after joining the team as a walk-on. During his redshirt sophomore season, he was awarded a scholarship and finished the year with 17 receptions for 315 yards and three touchdowns. As a redshirt junior, Austin caught 61 passes for 1,053 yards and 11 touchdowns and was named first-team All-American Athletic Conference (AAC). He repeated as a first-team All-AAC selection after finishing his redshirt senior season with 74 receptions for 1149 yards and eight touchdowns. After the conclusion of his college career, Austin was invited to play in the 2022 Senior Bowl.

Austin also ran track at Memphis and was named a second-team All-American in 2019.

College statistics

Source:

Professional career

Austin was drafted by the Pittsburgh Steelers in the fourth round, 138th overall, of the 2022 NFL Draft. He was placed on injured reserve on September 1, 2022.

References

External links
 Pittsburgh Steelers bio
Memphis Tigers bio

American football wide receivers
Memphis Tigers football players
Players of American football from Memphis, Tennessee
Living people
Memphis Tigers men's track and field athletes
1999 births
Pittsburgh Steelers players